Galatasaray Bridge Team is the bridge section of Galatasaray S.K., a major sports club in Istanbul, Turkey.

Honours

Turkish Championship

 Winner(3):  1999, 2000, 2009 as a team
 Runners-Up(1): 2009
 Third: 2006
 Third: 2007
 Third: 2008
 Winner: 2009 Nevzat Aydoğdu and Fikret Aydoğdu as a couple
 Winner: 2010 Dilek Yavaş and Serap Kuranoğlu as a couple

İstanbul Championship

 Winner(2): 2007 as a couple M. Ali İnce and Namık Kökten, 2011 as a team

Women's
 Winner(3):2011, 2012, 2013

European Championship

 Winner(2): 2008, 2011 as a team

External links
Galatasaray SK Official Web Site

References

Sport in Istanbul
Contract bridge clubs
1997 establishments in Turkey
Galatasaray Bridge